Azubuike is both a given name and a surname.  It may refer to:

Given name
Azubuike Egwuekwe (born 1989), Nigerian football defender
Azubuike Ihejirika (born 1956), Nigerian general
Azubuike Ishiekwene (born 1965), Nigerian newspaper journalist
Azubuike Okechukwu (born 1997), Nigerian football midfielder
Azubuike Oliseh (born 1978), Nigerian football midfielder

Surname
Chibuzor Azubuike or Phyno (born 1986), Nigerian rapper
Kelenna Azubuike (born 1983), American basketball player
Martins Azubuike, Nigerian politician
Owen Azubuike (died 2016), Nigerian bishop
Udoka Azubuike (born 1999), American basketball player